Darren Allinson (born 13 November 1987), a Welsh professional rugby union player. Allinson formerly played for Bath Rugby in the Aviva Premiership and plays at scrum half. He attended Ysgol Y Gwendraeth.

Cardiff Blues
Allinson joined Cardiff Blues in 2007 at the age of 18 from the Llanelli Scarlets Academy. He made 36 first team appearances at the Arms Park along with a winners medal when the Blues beat Toulon in the Amlin Cup (2010).

London Irish
Allinson joined London Irish in 2010 and made an immediate impact with over 20 first team appearances in his first season. He has since made 109 first XV appearances to date with a Man of the Match performance against Cardiff Blues in the Heineken Cup (2012).

Bath
Allison was loaned to Bath as injury cover in November 2016. Before signing a permeant deal on 20 February 2017

International
Representative Honours;

Wales U16, U18, U19, U20

References

1987 births
Rugby union players from Carmarthen
Living people
Welsh rugby union players
Rugby union scrum-halves
London Irish players